Five ships of the Royal Navy have been named HMS Mariner:

 The first , launched in 1801, was a 12-gun brig, sold in 1814.
 The second , launched in 1846, was a 16-gun brig, sold in 1865.
She foundered in the Atlantic in 1880.
 The fourth , launched in 1884, was a  composite screw sloop, sold in 1929.
She was transferred to the Burmese Navy in 1958 and renamed Yan Myo Aung.

References

Royal Navy ship names